The 1934 Central State Bearcats football team was an American football team that represented Central State Teachers College, later renamed Central Michigan University, as an independent during the 1934 college football season. In their first season under head coach Alex Yunevich, the Bearcats compiled a 5–3 record and were outscored by their opponents by a combined total of 82 to 81. The team defeated in-state rival Michigan State Normal (13–12) but lost to rival Western State Teachers (0–13).  Its worst defeat was by a 38–0 score against Gus Dorais' 1934 Detroit Titans football team.

Yunevich was hired as the head football coach at Central State in May 1934 after George Van Bibber accepted the head coaching position at the University at Buffalo. Both Yunevich and Van Biber were alumni of Purdue University. Yunevich had been an assistant coach at Central States under Van Bibber.

Schedule

References

Central State
Central Michigan Chippewas football seasons
Central State Bearcats football